The James and Jewell Salter House was a historic house at 159 South Broadview in Greenbrier, Arkansas.  It was a single-story wood-frame structure, finished in stone veneer with cream-colored brick trim elements.  It was built about 1945, its exterior masonry done by Silas Owens, Sr., a regionally prominent African-American stonemason.  It was unusual among Owens's works as an example of English Revival architecture done with his stylistic touches.

The house was listed on the National Register of Historic Places in 2005.  It is listed as destroyed in the Arkansas Historic Preservation Program database.

See also
National Register of Historic Places listings in Faulkner County, Arkansas

References

Houses on the National Register of Historic Places in Arkansas
Houses completed in 1945
Houses in Faulkner County, Arkansas
Demolished buildings and structures in Arkansas